This is a list of awards and nominations received by Twice, a South Korean girl group formed by JYP Entertainment in 2015. Since their debut they have received several awards and nominations including seven Circle Chart Music Awards, twelve Golden Disc Awards, eighteen MAMA Awards, five Melon Music Awards and seven Seoul Music Awards, as well as three MTV Europe Music Awards nominations and two MTV Video Music Awards nominations.

The group debuted in 2015 with "Like Ooh-Ahh", the lead single from the EP The Story Begins. The debut was a success and led the group to win rookie awards such as Rookie of the Year Award at the Golden Disc Awards and Best New Female Group at the 2015 Mnet Asian Music Awards. In 2016, they released "Cheer Up" to commercial success being their first of nine consecutive number-one singles at the Circle Digital Chart. The song won both Digital Bonsang and Digital Daesang at the 2017 Golden Disc Awards and Song of the Year at the 2016 Melon Music Awards. It also won Song of the Year at the 2016 Mnet Asian Music Awards, an award they would win the following two years (for "Signal" in 2017 and "What Is Love?" in 2018), being the act with most wins in the category tied with BTS with three wins. "Cheer Up" also gave the group their first win for the MAMA Award for Best Female Group.

In 2017 they released their debut studio album Twicetagram, which won Album Bonsang at the 32nd Golden Disc Awards, as well as four singles including "Knock Knock" and "Signal", which won Best Dance – Female at the 2017 Melon Music Awards and Best Dance Performance (Female Group) at the 2017 Mnet Asian Music Awards, respectively. Also in 2017, the group received a commendation awarded at the Korean Popular Culture and Arts Awards, hosted by the South Korean Ministry of Culture, Sports and Tourism, given to recognize individuals or groups for their contribution to popular culture in South Korea and abroad. In 2018, they released the successful singles "What Is Love?", "Dance the Night Away" and "Yes or Yes". At the 2018 Mnet Asian Music Awards, they won five awards including their second win for Best Female Group, while at the 2016 Gaon Chart Music Awards, "What Is Love?" won Song of the Year – April and "Dance the Night Away" won Song of the Year – July. 

In 2019 they released the singles "Fancy" and "Feel Special", the latter was their first number-one at the World Digital Songs chart. At the 2019 Mnet Asian Music Awards, "Fancy" won their third MAMA Award for Best Dance Performance (Female Group) while the EP Fancy You was nominated for Album of the Year. Their second studio album Eyes Wide Open was released in 2020. The same year they released the EP More & More which won Album Bonsang at the 35th Golden Disc Awards. The following year the single "Alcohol-Free" was released, the song was nominated for the MTV Video Music Award for Best K-Pop, being their first MTV VMA nomination. At the 2021 Mnet Asian Music Awards, the group won Best Female Group for the fourth time, being the girl group with most wins in the category. Their third studio album Formula of Love: O+T=＜3 was released in 2021, its lead single "Scientist" won Song of the Year – November at the 11th Gaon Chart Music Awards.



Awards and nominations

Other accolades

State honors

Listicles

Notes

References 

Twice
Awards